Muskrat Dam Airport  is located  north of the First Nations community of Muskrat Dam Lake First Nation, Ontario, Canada.

The runway is maintained Monday to Friday year-round.

Airlines and destinations

References

External links
 COPA Places To Fly page about Muskrat Dam Airport

Certified airports in Kenora District